Marvelous Nakamba (born 19 January 1994) is a Zimbabwean professional footballer who plays as a central midfielder for EFL Championship club Luton Town, on loan from Premier League club Aston Villa, and the Zimbabwe national team.

Club career

Early career
Born in Hwange near Victoria Falls in Zimbabwe, Nakamba made his senior debut with local team Bantu Rovers in 2010, aged 16. He left the country in July 2012, and had trials at French side Nancy.

Nakamba officially joined Nancy on 24 December 2012, aged 18, for an undisclosed fee. He received the international clearance seven days later, and was assigned to the reserve team in CFA.

On 9 May 2014, Nakamba played his first match as a professional, starting in a 3–1 home win against Angers SCO. He played his second match seven days later, coming on as a late substitute in a 0–0 away draw against AJ Auxerre, and a new deal was offered to him on 19 May.

Vitesse
In July 2014, Nakamba went on a trial at Eredivisie side Vitesse. On 13 August, he signed a four-year deal with the Arnhem side aged 20 years. Nakamba made his debut for the club on 27 September, coming on as a late substitute for Kelvin Leerdam in a 6–2 away win against Dordrecht. Nakamba started to establish himself in Vitesse's starting eleven during the 2015–16 campaign and went on to appear thirty times, scoring once against local rivals De Graafschap in a 2–2 draw.

He played as Vitesse won the final of the KNVB Beker 2–0 against AZ Alkmaar on 30 April 2017 to lead the club, three-time runners up, to the title for the first time in its 125-year history.

Club Brugge
On 20 June 2017, Nakamba joined Belgian side Club Brugge on a four-year deal for a fee around the margin of £4 million, aged 23 years. He made his league debut for the club on 29 July 2017 in a 4–0 away victory over Sporting Lokeren. He was replaced by Hans Vanaken in the 75th minute, having picked up a yellow card.

Aston Villa
On 1 August 2019, Marvelous Nakamba signed for Aston Villa aged 25 years, for a fee of €12 million. He joined up with former Club Brugge team-mate Wesley Moraes and former Club Brugge player Björn Engels, who had already joined Villa in that transfer window. Nakamba made his first appearance for Villa in a 6–1 emphatic victory against Crewe Alexandra in an EFL Cup game. Nakamba made his Premier League debut on 16 September 2019, in a 0–0 draw against West Ham at Villa Park.

In October 2019, a video purportedly showing racist chants from Aston Villa fans about Nakamba and teammate John McGinn surfaced, and was condemned by the club.

In a 2-1 away win at Tottenham on 19 May 2021, he created an assist for the equalising goal put in his own net by Sergio Reguilon. 

Nakamba was voted by fans as player of the month for November 2021, following a string of good performances under new Aston Villa manager Steven Gerrard. On 11 December 2021, Nakamba suffered a serious knee injury in a 1–0 defeat to Liverpool, the injury required surgery, with an estimated recovery time of three to four months, ruling Nakamba out of the 2021 Africa Cup of Nations.

Loan to Luton Town 
On 31 January 2023, having not made an appearance for Aston Villa so far that season, Nakamba joined EFL Championship club Luton Town on loan for the remainder of the season. On 4 February 2023, he made his debut in a 1–0 victory over Stoke City.

International career
Nakamba is a Zimbabwe international, having represented the country in the under-20 level. On 13 June 2015, aged 21 years, he made his debut with the main squad, coming on as a second-half substitute in a 2–1 win against Malawi.

Personal life 
Nakamba was born in Hwange in north-western Zimbabwe. He secretly married his long-term girlfriend Chipo Primrose Makurumure in 2020 during a short visit to Bulawayo. His father Anthony was also a footballer, playing as a goalkeeper for Hwange Colliery F.C. and his mother Charity worked as a maid for a family in South Africa. As a child his family experienced poverty, living together in a one-bedroom home in Bulawayo with his younger brother Junior. His mother worked overtime to buy Marvelous his first pair of Puma football boots.

After Nakamba's Premier League debut on 16 September 2019, Zimbabwean footballer Peter Ndlovu confirmed that Nakamba would have a statue built in his honour in Hwange, as he was only the 4th Zimbabwean player to play in the English Football League.

In March 2020, Nakamba created the Marvelous Nakamba Foundation - an organisation funded by Nakamba which aimed to help improve the lives of young people in Zimbabwe. On 22 March 2020, Nakamba paid the tuition and examination fees of 1000 pupils from underprivileged backgrounds in Bulawayo. His goal was to reach 100,000 pupils by December 2021 and then 1 million pupils by 2024. On 5 May 2021, Nakamba met Prince William, Duke of Cambridge, after the Marvelous Nakamba foundation had been involved in several projects around Zimbabwe, including working to revamp Hwange Hospital, feed programmes for children at rural schools, the provision of personal protective equipment for schools during the COVID-19 pandemic in Zimbabwe.

In May 2021, Nakamba announced the creation of the Marvelous Nakamba Foundation Youth Invitational Tournament - an under-17 football tournament. It was originally scheduled for June 2021, however this was postponed due to the COVID-19 pandemic. On 5 June 2022, Nakamba announced that he had finally received clearance from authorities for the tournament to go ahead at the White City Stadium in Bulawayo on 25 & 26 June. The tournament went ahead as planned, with the youth academy of Majesa defeating Highlanders academy in the final.

In June 2021, Nakamba's charitable works were recognised by Zimbabwean President Emmerson Mnangagwa, who said that he was "eager to plough [his earnings] back into the community"

On 13 June 2022, the Marvelous Nakamba Foundation started construction work on a multi-sports complex in Bulawayo with football, tennis, basketball, volleyball and swimming facilities. Nakamba took part in a groundbreaking ceremony on the first day of building.

On 16 June 2022, International Day of the African Child, Nakamba announced that he was working with UNICEF on projects to help protect young girls from child marriage in Zimbabwe.

Career statistics

Club

International

Honours
Vitesse
KNVB Cup: 2016–17

Club Brugge
Belgian First Division A: 2017–18

Aston Villa
EFL Cup runner-up: 2019–20

Zimbabwe
COSAFA Cup third place: 2019

References

External links

1994 births
Living people
Sportspeople from Matabeleland North Province
Zimbabwean footballers
Association football midfielders
Highlanders F.C. players
Bantu Tshintsha Guluva Rovers F.C. players
AS Nancy Lorraine players
SBV Vitesse players
Club Brugge KV players
Aston Villa F.C. players
Championnat National players
Ligue 2 players
Eredivisie players
Belgian Pro League players
Premier League players
Zimbabwe international footballers
2017 Africa Cup of Nations players
2019 Africa Cup of Nations players
Zimbabwean expatriate footballers
Zimbabwean expatriate sportspeople in France
Zimbabwean expatriate sportspeople in the Netherlands
Zimbabwean expatriate sportspeople in Belgium
Zimbabwean expatriate sportspeople in England
Expatriate footballers in France
Expatriate footballers in the Netherlands
Expatriate footballers in Belgium
Expatriate footballers in England
Luton Town F.C. players
English Football League players